Music of the Heart is a 1999 American biographical musical drama film directed by Wes Craven and written by Pamela Gray, based on the 1995 documentary Small Wonders. The film is a dramatization of the true story of Roberta Guaspari, portrayed by Meryl Streep, who co-founded the Opus 118 Harlem School of Music and fought for music education funding in New York City public schools. The film also stars Aidan Quinn, Gloria Estefan (in her film debut), and Angela Bassett. It was director Craven's first and only mainstream cinematic film not in the horror or thriller genre, and also his only film to receive Oscar nominations.

Plot

In 1981 New York City, Roberta Guaspari, a recently divorced violinist, lives with her two sons, Alexi and Nicholas Tzavaras, and her mother, Assunta Guaspari. With Assunta's encouragement, Guaspari attempts to rebuild her life and is recommended to the head teacher of East Harlem's Central Park East School. Despite having little experience in actual music teaching, she accepts a substitute violin teaching position at Central Park East. With a combination of her toughness and determination, she inspires a group of children, and their initially skeptical parents. The program slowly develops and attracts publicity, eventually expanding to Central Park East II and River East Schools.

Ten years later, the Central Park East, Central Park East II and River East School string programs work with the New York City Board of Education to help eliminate funding for the programs, which leads to Guaspari's early dismissal. Determined to fight the budget cuts, she enlists the support of former pupils, parents and teachers and plans a benefit concert, Fiddlefest, to raise money so that the program can continue. But with a few weeks to go and all participants furiously rehearsing, they lose the venue. However, Arnold Steinhardt, the husband of a publicist friend, is a violinist in the Guarneri Quartet, and he enlists the support of other well-known musicians, including Isaac Stern and Itzhak Perlman. They arrange for the concert to be mounted at Carnegie Hall.

On the day of Fiddlefest, Guaspari and her students perform with Perlman, Steinhardt, Stern, Mark O'Connor, Michael Tree, Charles Veal Jr., Karen Briggs, Sandra Park, Diane Monroe, and Joshua Bell, increasing donations and making the event a massive success.

In the epilogue, descriptions show Guaspari and the Opus 118 program's activities after the events in 1991.

Cast
Meryl Streep as Roberta Guaspari
Aidan Quinn as Brian Turner, Roberta's love interest
Angela Bassett as Janet Williams, school principal
Gloria Estefan as Isabel Vasquez, a teacher
Cloris Leachman as Assunta Vitali Guaspari, Roberta's mother
Josh Pais as Dennis Rausch
Jane Leeves as Dorothea von Haeften, a wealthy socialite 
Kieran Culkin as Alexi Tzavaras, Roberta's son
Michael Angarano as Nick Tzavaras, Roberta's son
Jay O. Sanders as Dan Paxton
 Jean-Luke Figueroa as Ramone Olivas, a student
Olga Merediz as Ms. Olivas, Ramone's mother
Adam LeFevre as Mr. Klein
Charlie Hofheimer as Nicholas Tzavaras, Roberta's son
Betsy Aidem as Mrs. Lamb

Itzhak Perlman, Arnold Steinhardt, Isaac Stern, Mark O'Connor, Michael Tree, Charles Veal Jr., Karen Briggs, Sandra Park, Diane Monroe, and Joshua Bell all cameo as themselves in the film's recreation of the Carnegie Hall benefit concert (at which all were actually present).

Production
Roberta Guaspari and the Opus 118 Harlem School of Music was featured in the 1995 documentary film Small Wonders, which was later nominated for an Academy Award for Best Documentary Feature. After seeing Small Wonders, Wes Craven, known for his work on horror films, was inspired to make a full-length film about Guaspari. Madonna was originally signed to play the role of Guaspari, but left the project before filming began, citing "creative differences" with Craven. When she left, Madonna had already studied for many months to play the violin. Streep learned to play Bach's Concerto for 2 Violins for the film.

The film marked the screen debut of singer Gloria Estefan.

Critical reception
The film received mixed reception, though many reviews tended to be slightly positive. Most critics applauded Meryl Streep's portrayal of Roberta Guaspari. The film had a 64% approval rating at Rotten Tomatoes. CinemaScore reported that audiences gave the film a rare "A+" grade. Critic Eleanor Ringel Gillespie of the Atlanta Journal-Constitution concluded that "There are more challenging movies around. More original ones, too. But "Music of the Heart" gets the job done, efficiently and entertainingly." Roger Ebert gave the film three stars out of four and wrote that "Meryl Streep is known for her mastery of accents; she may be the most versatile speaker in the movies. Here you might think she has no accent, unless you've heard her real speaking voice; then you realize that Guaspari's speaking style is no less a particular achievement than Streep's other accents. This is not Streep's voice, but someone else's - with a certain flat quality, as if later education and refinement came after a somewhat unsophisticated childhood." Steve Rosen said that "The key to Meryl Streep's fine performance is that she makes Guaspari unheroically ordinary. Ultimately that makes her even more extraordinary."

In 2014, the movie was one of several discussed by Keli Goff in The Daily Beast in an article concerning white savior narratives in film.

Box office
The film opened at #5 at the North American box office making $3.6 million in its opening weekend.

Accolades

Soundtrack album track listing
 "Music of My Heart" - Gloria Estefan and *NSYNC (4:32)
 "Baila" - Jennifer Lopez (3:54)
 "Turn the Page" - Aaliyah (4:16)
 "Groove with Me Tonight" (Pablo Flores English radio version) - MDO (4:37) 
 "Seventeen" - Tre O (3:48)
 "One Night with You" - C Note (5:04)
 "Do Something" (Organized Noize Mix) - Macy Gray (3:53)
 "Revancha de Amor" - Gizelle d'Cole (4:06)
 "Nothing Else" - Julio Iglesias Jr. (4:23)
 "Love Will Find You" - Jaci Velasquez (4:34)
 "Music of My Heart" (Lawrence Dermer Remix); mislabeled as "Pablo Flores Remix" - Gloria Estefan and *NSYNC (4:23) 
 "Concerto in D Minor for Two Violins" - Johann Sebastian Bach, played by Itzhak Perlman and Joshua Bell (3:56)

Certifications

References

External links
 
 Movie stills
 Opus 118 Harlem School of Music

1999 films
1990s English-language films
1990s crime drama films
American crime drama films
American musical drama films
Films about violins and violinists
Films about classical music and musicians
Films set in New York City
Musical films based on actual events
Biographical films about educators
Cultural depictions of American women
Cultural depictions of classical musicians
Films shot in New York City
Films shot in New Jersey
Films directed by Wes Craven
Films set in schools
Films scored by Mason Daring
1999 drama films
1990s American films